Laguna Verde is a Chilean town in the commune of Valparaíso in Valparaíso Province, Valparaíso Region. The town itself is small and quiet, feeling quite removed from hustle and bustle of nearby Valparaiso. Attractions include secluded beaches and miles of old logging roads perfect for mountain biking.

There the people can find very interesting places such as: "Las Canteras" that is a sequence of different water falls and natural pools, "La Playa Chica" that is like a little beach nearby the power plant that operates with coal, "La Caleta Chica" and "La Caleta Grande" that are little spots where fisherman families live and work, "Las Docas" that is a beach with big waves and is a very good spot for fishing and "El Faro" that is located at the end of the gulf and has the Lighthouse that helps the boats that get to Valparaíso.

See also
 List of towns in Chile

Beaches of Chile
Populated places in Valparaíso Province
Landforms of Valparaíso Region